Robert Forget (15 January 1955 – 20 December 2005) was a Canadian athlete. He competed in the men's high jump at the 1976 Summer Olympics.

References

1955 births
2005 deaths
Athletes (track and field) at the 1976 Summer Olympics
Canadian male high jumpers
Olympic track and field athletes of Canada
Athletes from Montreal